The Research Triangle Regional Public Transportation Authority, known as GoTriangle (previously Triangle Transit and Triangle Transit Authority or TTA), provides regional bus service to the Research Triangle region of North Carolina in Wake, Durham, and Orange counties. The GoTriangle name was adopted in 2015 as part of the consolidated GoTransit branding scheme for the Triangle.

History 
The 1989 session of the North Carolina General Assembly enabled the creation of the Triangle Transit Authority as a regional public transportation authority serving Durham, Orange, and Wake counties. The new unit of local government was chartered by the NC Secretary of State on December 1, 1989.

 1991 – the NC General Assembly, subject to County approvals, authorized Triangle Transit to levy a vehicle registration tax of up to $5 per registration. This tag tax finances the regional bus operations, vanpooling program, and planning program.
 1992 – the Triangle Transit Authority (TTA) completed the Triangle Fixed Guideway Study, after securing a grant from the Federal Transit Administration (FTA) to study long-range regional public transportation for the three-county Triangle region (Durham, Orange, and Wake).
 Feb 1995 – TTA Board of Trustees adopted the Preliminary Recommendations for a Regional Transit Plan, after evaluating several alternatives and received feedback from land use and transportation professionals, elected officials and the public.
 Oct 1995 – TTA Board of Trustees adopted the recommendations for a Regional Transit Plan and subsequently incorporated into the region's two long-range transportation plans. This document guides regional transit planning efforts today.
 1997 – the NC General Assembly, subject to County approvals, authorized Triangle Transit to levy a rental vehicle tax of up to 5% of gross receipts. This tax, effective January 1, 1998, will finance future capital projects.
 Jan 1998 – TTA, in cooperation with the FTA, initiated the Preliminary Engineering (PE) phase of project development and started preparing a Draft Environmental Impact Statement (DEIS) for the proposed Regional Rail Transit System.
 May 2001 – The DEIS was prepared in accordance with the National Environmental Policy Act (NEPA) and all applicable federal rules and regulations.
 Jan 2003 – FTA issued a Record of Decision (ROD), confirming that the analyses, mitigation, public involvement, and other objectives had been met.
 Feb 2003 – Following the issuance of the ROD, the FTA approved TTA's request to enter Final Design.
 Aug 2005 – TTA completed the 100% level of design and continued progressing toward the receipt of federal funds. In late 2007, due to rising project costs and a change in federal New Starts cost-benefits formulas, Triangle Transit elected not to submit a New Starts application for FTA funding. As a result, work on the regional rail system was suspended in order to reexamine costs and future funding options.

Triangle Transit was created to plan, finance, organize, and operate a public transportation system for the Research Triangle area. It has three main program areas:

 Regional bus service
 Vanpool service
 Regional transit planning

From 1995, the cornerstone of Triangle Transit's long-term plan was a 28-mile rail corridor from northeast Raleigh, through downtown Raleigh, Cary, and Research Triangle Park, to Durham using DMU technology. There were proposals to extend this corridor 7 miles to Chapel Hill with light rail technology. However, in 2006 Triangle Transit deferred implementation indefinitely when the Federal Transit Administration declined to fund the program. Planning began on a new light rail project between Durham and Chapel Hill in 2013.

On March 17, 2008, after 15 years as Triangle Transit Authority, the Board of Trustees changed the agency's name and logo to Triangle Transit. Triangle Transit Board Chair Sig Hutchinson announced its new promise to the Triangle:

Triangle Transit improves our region’s quality of life by connecting people and places with reliable, safe, and easy-to-use travel choices that reduce congestion and energy use, save money, and promote sustainability, healthier lifestyles, and a more environmentally responsible community.

GoTriangle is governed by a thirteen-member Board of Trustees. Ten members are appointed by the region's principal municipalities and counties and three members are appointed by the North Carolina Secretary of Transportation.

Planning for a regional transit system began in the early 1990s under the guidance of the Triangle Transit Authority. In 1992, the Triangle Fixed Guideway Study was completed after securing a grant from the Federal Transit Administration (FTA) to study long-range regional public transportation for the three-county Triangle region (Durham, Orange, and Wake). The study examined regional economic growth opportunities and identified potential locations for growth, corridors that could connect these growth areas, and changes in land use that would need to take place to support transit. Recommendations from the plan were adopted by the TTA Board of Trustees in 1995, and were incorporated into the region's long-range transportation plans. By 1998, preliminary engineering and environmental planning of the project was underway. In 2003, the FTA issued a record of decision and allowed the project to move into final design.

TTA completed the 100% level of design and continued progressing toward the receipt of federal funds in 2005. In late 2007, due to rising project costs and a change in federal New Starts cost-benefits formulas, Triangle Transit elected not to submit a New Starts application for FTA funding. As a result, work on the regional rail system was suspended in order to reexamine costs and future funding options.

To analyze the future of regional rail in the Triangle, a partnership between TTA, Capital Area Metropolitan Planning Organization (CAMPO), Durham-Chapel Hill-Carrboro Metropolitan Planning Organization (DCHC), NC Department of Transportation's Public Transportation Division (NCDOT), and Triangle J Council of Governments (TJCOG) jointly conducted The Transit Blueprint Technical Analysis Project. This 2007 effort was a collaboration between agencies to provide the technical basis for analyzing both future transit corridors and the planned or potential transit infrastructure investment within those corridors. The results of the Blueprint have been used to set priorities for major transit investments based on land use, travel market, and cost characteristics.

The Special Transit Advisory Commission (STAC), which met between May 2007 and April 2008, was a broad-based citizen group with 38 members from across the Research Triangle Region. The STAC was appointed by CAMPO and DCHC to assist in the joint development of a plan for a regional transit system and to craft recommendations for the transit component of their respective Long Range Transportation Plans (LRTPs), with a focus on major transit investments. The Commission presented their final report to the metropolitan planning organizations (MPOs) at a joint meeting on May 21, 2008.

In 2009 the region's two planning organizations, CAMPO and DCHC, completed work on 2035 Long Range Transportation Plans. The plans include increased bus service and the addition of rail service. A coalition of transit, transportation, and environmental groups joined to support State House Bill 148, providing for future referendums for funding transit projects using voter-approved sales taxes. Triangle and Triad counties can hold referendums on a one-half cent sales tax for transit. Other counties are permitted to go to the voters for a one-quarter cent sales tax. With passage in the NC General Assembly in summer 2009, Governor Bev Perdue signed the bill into law in August 2009.

Currently, counties in the region are working with Triangle Transit, CAMPO and DCHC to finalize individual county plans, which will include enhanced transit options. County Commissions have the authority to call for a referendum when they are satisfied with the transit plans they have decided upon and are ready to go to the voters for funding. Durham County passed a one-half cent sales tax for transit in November 2011. The adopted bill also ties state funding into future projects.

In April 2012, a Notice of Intent (NOI) was published in the Federal Register indicating that the Federal Transit Administration and Triangle Transit intend to prepare an Environmental Impact Statement (EIS) for the Durham-Orange LRT project only. Scoping meetings for the D-O LRT project took place in May 2012 in order to bring together elected officials and regulatory agencies (the US Department of Transportation, US Environmental Protection Agency, US Army Corps of Engineers, and others).  From their discussions, a Scoping Report was published and identified all human and natural environment aspects of the project that required additional analysis and consideration during the EIS phase.

Evaluation of the Wake Corridor and the Durham-Wake Corridor options continues in the background.

The Environmental Impact Analysis for the Durham-Orange LRT project started with Scoping in 2012 and continues in 2013 with environmental monitoring, delineation of the potential project boundaries and alignment, and agency communication and coordination.

Three public meetings in November 2013 will show the alternatives carried forward for further study in the Environmental Impact Statement phase.

Routes and Major Destinations 
GoTriangle is a regional public transportation provider, offering a wide variety of transit and vanpool services to North Carolina's Triangle Region and outlying counties. Regional bus and shuttle service is available to Apex, Cary, Chapel Hill, Durham, Hillsborough, RDU International Airport, Research Triangle Park, Raleigh, Wake Forest, Wendell, and Zebulon.

GoTriangle is a supporting agency of the Special Transit Advisory Commission's work to plan for the region's transit future.  The STAC completed its work in May 2008 and has provided its recommendations to the area's two planning organizations: Capital Area Metropolitan Planning Organization (CAMPO) and Durham-Chapel Hill-Carrboro Metropolitan Planning Organization (DCHC MPO).

Route list 
All GoTriangle routes operates in three categories. Core, Regional, and Express.

Core routes connect major destinations at all times. Regional routes provides additional service to existing Core routes and/or serves farther regions outside the Triangle.

Express routes only stop between major or more farther destinations and have non-stop sections, . They only run during rush-hours.

Fleet 
GoTriangle's operates a fleet of Gillig Low Floor buses for its fixed-route service. They also operate paratransit buses for their ACCESS program. All buses have bike racks on, which can support up to two bikes. This is to improve public transit usage for the system. All buses are Wi-Fi enabled, either built-in or retrofitted for any model before 2017.

Current Roster 
Here is the current bus roster as of October 2022,

Fleet Livery 
During the three phases of the company, they went through three livery changes. The first one, used by TTA until 2007, utilized a white, dark green, and black body with a single stripe in the white body. The second one, used when it was rebranded to Triangle Transit, used a more vibrant livery. It uses a yellow-green body with orange, white, and blue waves on the body. When the company revamped itself to GoTriangle, it used the same livery as the other GoTransit operators around them. They used a gray base, with hues of green triangles around the back. Despite the switchover to GoTriangle, some buses operating that were made before 2012 retains the old Triangle Transit livery. The top stripe displays their new motto, Connecting all points of the Triangle.

Major Transit Systems & Centers

Regional Transit Center (Park & Ride) 
GoTriangle currently has a transit center located near Slater Road in Durham. Originally located in RTP. This center also has a park and ride nearby. You can also find a office near the terminal.

This center is currently served by GoTriangle's 100, 700, and 800 routes at all times, GoTriangle's 310 route during weekdays, GoTriangle's 105, 311, 805, and NRX routes during peak hours only, and GoDurham's 12B route during weekdays

GoRaleigh 

GoRaleigh is the transit agency serving Raleigh. Service operates from 4:30am–12:00am Monday-Saturdays, and roughly 5:00am–11:00pm during Sundays. They currently run 35 routes, separated into local routes, 'L' Circulator routes, and 'X' Express routes.

Most routes serve GoRaleigh Station, which is located near Moore Square. The terminal also serves GoTriangle's 100 and 300 routes at all times and GoTriangle's 105, 301, 305, CRX, DRX, FRX, WRX, and ZWX routes during peak hours only.

GoDurham 

GoDurham is the transit system serving Durham. Service runs from 5:30 am–12:30 am during Mondays-Saturdays, and from 6:30 am–9:30 pm during Sundays. They operate 21 bus routes.

Almost all routes serve Durham Station, located near the Amtrak station. The terminal serves GoTriangle's 400 and 700 routes at all times and GoTriangle's 405, DRX, and ODX routes during peak hours only.

Chapel Hill Transit 

Chapel Hill Transit is the transit system serving Chapel Hill and Carrboro. Service operates from 5 am to 1:15 am during weekdays, 8 am to 6:30 pm during Saturdays, and from 10:30 am to 11:30 pm during Sundays. They currently operate 20 routes, including express routes.

They serve the University of North Carolina at Chapel Hill, serving as a major transfer hub for all routes. The terminal serves GoTriangle's 400 and 800 routes at all times and GoTriangle's 405, 420, 805, and CRX routes during peak hours only.

Chapel Hill is building an 8.2 mile Bus Rapid Transit (BRT) with a projected cost of $125 million to commence passenger service in 2020 with annual operating cost of $3.4 million.

GoCary/GoApex 

GoCary is the transit system serving Cary and operates GoApex, which serves Apex. Service runs between 6 am to 10 pm between Mondays-Saturdays and 7 am to 9 pm. They operate 8 routes. They also service GoApex, which only runs one route. They also offer paratransit services.

All GoCary routes serve Cary Station, while GoApex Route 1 serves Downtown Apex. GoTriangle's 300 route serves Cary Station at all times and GoTriangle's 301 and 310 route during weekdays. Downtown Apex is served by GoTriangle's 305 and 311 routes during peak hours only.

Orange Public Transportation 
Orange Public Transportation is a transit program serving Hillsborough, Outer Chapel Hill, and Carrboro. They offer fixed-route bus service and paratransit services. They currently run three fixed-route circulator routes.

All routes serve Downtown Hillsborough. This area is served by GoTriangle's 405, 420, and ODX routes during peak hours only.

Rail transit planning

Durham–Orange Light Rail Transit 

GoTriangle was planning a  light rail line between the University of North Carolina at Chapel Hill and East Durham, traveling through Duke University and paralleling the North Carolina Railroad alignment through Durham and proceeding to North Carolina Central University (NCCU). The original project was estimated at $1.4 billion (in 2011). The final project was estimated to cost $2.5 billion (year of expenditure) or $141 million per mile with an annual operating cost of $28.7 million. The line would have had a connection to Amtrak via its station in Durham.

A final environmental impact statement was released by GoTriangle in February 2016, projecting 23,020 daily trips in 2040. The plan was amended to extend to NCCU in November 2016, projecting 26,880 daily trips in 2040. The line would have had 18 stations (4 stations in Orange County, 14 stations in Durham County); end-to-end travel time would have been 42–44 minutes. The line was projected to begin construction in 2020 and be complete by 2028 but ultimately was discontinued in April 2019.

Commuter rail 

After the failure of the Durham–Orange Light Rail project, GoTriangle began studying the possibility of instating a commuter rail service which would serve Durham, Raleigh, Cary, Morrisville, Research Triangle Park, and Garner, possibly as far as Clayton.

References

External links 

 Official webpage
 Carpool and Vanpool Matching
 Special Transit Advisory Commission Report

Bus transportation in North Carolina
Transportation in Raleigh, North Carolina
Research Triangle